Caricuao is a Caracas Metro station on Line 2. It was opened on 4 October 1987 as part of the inaugural section of Line 2 from La Paz to Las Adjuntas and Zoológico, on the branch leading to Zoológico. The station is between Mamera and Zoológico.

The station is located in the district of Caricuao, hence the name.

References

Caracas Metro stations
1987 establishments in Venezuela
Railway stations opened in 1987